The 1960 Norwegian Football Cup was the 55th season of the Norwegian annual knockout football tournament. The tournament was open for all members of NFF, except those from Northern Norway. Viking was the defending champions, but was eliminated by the second tier team Freidig in the fourth round.

The final was contested by the eleven-time former winners Odd and the second-tier team Rosenborg who made their debut in the Norwegian Cup final. This year's final needed a rematch to decide a winner, as the first match ended with a 3–3 draw. The result after  in the second match was 1–1, but after extra time Rosenborg had won 3-2 and could celebrate the clubs first Norwegian Cup trophy.

First round

 

 

|-
|colspan="3" style="background-color:#97DEFF"|Replay

|}

Second round

|-
|colspan="3" style="background-color:#97DEFF"|Replay

|}

Third round

|colspan="3" style="background-color:#97DEFF"|14 August 1960

|-
|colspan="3" style="background-color:#97DEFF"|Replay: 24 August 1960

|}

Fourth round

|colspan="3" style="background-color:#97DEFF"|4 September 1960

|-
|colspan="3" style="background-color:#97DEFF"|Replay: 7 September 1960

|-
|colspan="3" style="background-color:#97DEFF"|Replay: 14 September 1960

|}

Quarter-finals

|colspan="3" style="background-color:#97DEFF"|25 September 1960

|-
|colspan="3" style="background-color:#97DEFF"|Replay: 2 October 1960

|}

Semi-finals

|colspan="3" style="background-color:#97DEFF"|9 October 1960

|}

Final

First match

Replay match

See also
1959–60 Norwegian Main League
1960 in Norwegian football

References

Norwegian Football Cup seasons
Norway
Football Cup